Szombathelyi Haladás, is a Hungarian football club based in Szombathely. Haladás is the Hungarian word for progress. The club, which was founded in 1919, plays its home games at the Haladás Sportkomplexum which has a capacity of 8,903. The club colours are green and white.

Haladás reached the Hungarian Cup final in the years 1975, 1993 and 2002. Since its first promotion in 1936 the club has spent 51 seasons in the first division of the Hungarian league, the Nemzeti Bajnokság I (NB I).

History

The yoyo years
Since 1919 the club have been famous for their yoyo between the Hungarian First Division and the Hungarian Second Division. The club were unable to strengthen their stay in the first league which resulted a continuous yoyo effect.

The 2000s
In the 2001–02 season of the Hungarian Cup Haladás played in the final against Újpest. The club lost 2–1 after extra time.
In January 2002 Haladás appointed Lázár Szentes as the new coach of the club. In the 2001–02 season Haladás was facing relegation problems.
In August 2003 Lajos Détári resigned as coach of the club.
In October 2003 former Zalaegerszeg championship-winner coach Péter Bozsik was appointed as the coach of the club.
In the 2006–07 season of the Hungarian Second Division the club missed out on promotion to the first division because of an 11 points deduction for the use of ineligible players. BFC Siófok was promoted in the place of Haladás.

In the 2008 Haladás won the Hungarian Second Division which resulted the promotion of the club to the first division.
In 2008 Haladás played with Arsenal a pre-season friendly match in Szombathely. The match finished 1–1.

In the 2008–09 season Haladás reached the best rank ever in the history of the team. The club won the bronze medal and got the right to start the qualification rounds in the Europa League.

In the Europa League 2009–10 season Haladás played against Irtysh Pavlodar in the first round. The first leg finished 1–0 thanks to Krisztián Kenesei's goal in the 79th minute. In the second leg the result was 2–1 to Irtysh, which meant that Haladás could play in the second round. In the second round Haladás played the Swedish club Elfsborg. In the first leg Haladás lost 3–0, while at home. During the second leg, Haladás drew with Elfsborg which caused them to be knocked out of the tournament.

2010s
Szombathely were eliminated from the round of 16 of the 2018–19 Magyar Kupa by Mezőkövesd SE on 0–1 aggregate.

In the 2018–19 Nemzeti Bajnokság I season Haladás finished 12th and they were relegated to the Nemzeti Bajnokság II to compete in the 2019–20 Nemzeti Bajnokság II season.

2020s
The 2019–20 Nemzeti Bajnokság II was abandoned due to the COVID-19 pandemic. Haladás finished the season on the 17th place thus avoiding relegation to the Nemzeti Bajnokság III.

Colours, badge, and nicknames
The colours of the club are green and white. This combination is very common in Hungarian League since Ferencváros, Győr, Kaposvár, Paks have the same colour combination.

Manufacturers and shirt sponsors
The following table shows in detail Szombathelyi Haladás kit manufacturers and shirt sponsors by year:

Stadium

Szombathelyi Haladás play their home matches at the Rohonci úti Stadion situated in Szombathely, Hungary. The capacity of the old stadium was 9,500. It was built in 1923 and it was demolished in 2015. It hosted the hammer throw events for the IAAF World Athletics Final as the Stade Louis II in Monaco is too small. Currently Haladás play their home matches in Sopron.

On 8 November 2017, the Haladás Sportkomplexum was opened. The first official match was played between Haladás and Ferencvárosi TC in the 2017-18 Nemzeti Bajnokság I season.

Honours
 Nemzeti Bajnokság II
 Winners (10): 1938–39, 1941–42, 1944–45, 1961–62, 1972–73, 1980–81, 1990–91, 1992–93, 1994–95, 2007–08
 Runners-up (1): 2002–03
 Magyar Kupa
 Runners-up (3): 1974–75, 1992–93, 2001–02

Players 

As of 5 August, 2022.

In European football

Managers
 István Mészáros (1942–43)
 Károly Soós (1947–48, 1948–50)
 Iuliu Bodola (1951–53)
 József Albert (1966) and (1969)
 László Sárosi (1974–79)
 Dezső Novák (01/07/1987–30/06/1988)
 László Dajka (1998–99)
 Lázár Szentes (03/01/2002–11/06/2002)
 Róbert Glázer (20/06/2002–24/04/2003)
 Lajos Détári (29/03/2003–26/08/2003)
 Péter Bozsik (2003–04)
 Tamás Artner (08/07/2005–21/06/2007)
 Aurél Csertői (21/06/2007–15/09/2009)
 Antal Róth (16/09/2009–23/07/2010)
 Aurél Csertői (23/07/2010–16/10/2010)
 Zoltán Aczél (16/10/2010–14/12/2011)
 Tamás Artner (19/12/2011–17/10/2014)
 Lázár Szentes (17/10/2014–20/04/2015)
 Attila Kuttor (21/04/2015–05/05/2015)
 Géza Mészöly (05/05/2015–30/08/2017)
 Bálint Pacsi (30/08/2017-12/11/2017)
 Michal Hipp (13/11/2017–15/09/2018)
 Ferenc Horváth (27/09/2018–30/06/2019)
 Attila Supka (11/07/2019–29/10/2019)
 Szilárd Desits (29/10/2019–30/12/2019)
 János Mátyus (30/12/2019–31/05/2021)
 Szabolcs Németh (04/06/2021–)

References

External links
Official website 

 
Football clubs in Hungary
Association football clubs established in 1919
1919 establishments in Hungary